The 2014 KNSB Dutch Single Distance Championships were held at the Thialf ice stadium in Heerenveen from 25 October until 27 October 2013. Although the tournament was held in 2013 it was the 2014 edition as it is part of the 2013/2014 speed skating season.

Schedule

Medalists

Men 

Men's results: Schaatsen.nl  & SchaatsStatistieken.nl

Women 

Women's results: Schaatsen.nl  & SchaatsStatistieken.nl

References

External links
 KNSB

Dutch Single Distance Championships
KNSB Dutch Single Distance Championships
2014 Single Distance
KNSB Dutch Single Distance Championships, 2014